Curien may refer to:

Hubert Curien (1924–2005), a French physicist and a key figure in European science politics
Hubert Curien Pluridisciplinary Institute
Hubert Curien Laboratory
Curien Kaniamparambil (1913–2015), a priest in the Jacobite Syrian Christian Church and a scholar in Syriac language
Curien, a fictional family in The House of the Dead

See also

Curienne, a commune in France